Whitemare is an English rock band from Brighton, formed in 2008. The group's line-up features ex-Architects vocalist Matt Johnson, ex-Johnny Truant guitarist Al Kilcullen  and ex-Centurion drummer Eugene Economou. In 2009, Whitemare recorded a five track EP which was released through Small Town Records, with the band's style being described as a cross between hardcore punk, stoner rock and Southern rock. Whitemare then released their first album, Snider, worldwide on 11 November 2011.

History

Early line-up
At its inception, the band's lineup included Architects guitarist Tim Hillier-Brook on Bass and Adam 'Burns' Hall on second guitar. However, after a short amount of time Tim Hillier-Brook departed Whitemare to focus on the increasing success of Architects, and the band also decided the music would be better suited to a single guitarist rather than two. Subsequent bassists have included Tristen Macfie, Robin Urbino, and the current bassist Lewis Porter as of November 2010.

Snider (2011)
Whitemare released their debut album, Snider, on 11 November 2011. It was recorded over the space of two days with Gez Walton (ex-The Ghost of a Thousand) mixing and producing. The album received an almost unanimously positive reaction from the UK rock-media, being hailed as a promising debut.

Discography

References

External links
 Whitemare on Facebook

English rock music groups